Potomac Airfield , also known as Potomac Airport, is a privately owned, public-use airport located in the Friendly census-designated place in unincorporated Prince George's County, Maryland, United States (just outside Washington, D.C.); it has a Fort Washington postal address. It is a general aviation airport, and there is no scheduled airline service available.

Potomac Airfield is one of the "Maryland 3" airports located within the Washington, D.C. Flight Restricted Zone (FRZ), so it is subject to the Special Flight Rules Area restrictions imposed by the FAA after the September 11 attacks.

Although most U.S. airports use the same three-letter location identifier for the FAA and IATA, Potomac Airfield is assigned VKX by the FAA but has no designation from the IATA.

Facilities and aircraft 
There are 91 aircraft based at this airport: 97% single engine and 3% multi-engine.

In popular culture 

The airfield appears in a season 3 episode of Fetch! With Ruff Ruffman entitled "Mission Improbable". It is where the six FETCHers track down and eventually catch the spy which stole Ruff's prized collar.

References

External links 

Airports in Maryland
Transportation buildings and structures in Prince George's County, Maryland